Trachymela is a genus of beetles, commonly called leaf beetles and in the subfamily Chrysomelinae.  These beetles are usually brown or black and have elytra with verrucae (bumps) and lacking striae. Trachymela can be found in all states of Australia There are over 120 species.

Trachymela is native to Australia and New Guinea and introduced elsewhere.  Host-plants: Myrtaceae (Angophora, Eucalyptus, Leptospermum).

Taxonomy 
The genus was first described by Julius Weise in 1908. In 1994, Mauro Daccordi synonymised the genus Chondromela with Trachymela, defining it as a subgenus of Trachymela.

Selected species
(From IRMNG)
 Trachymela granaria 
 Trachymela litigiosa
 Trachymela nodosa
 Trachymela papuligera
 Trachymela rugosa
 Trachymela sloanei
 Trachymela tincticollis

References

Chrysomelinae
Beetles of Australia
Chrysomelidae genera
Taxa named by Julius Weise
Taxa described in 1908